Robert LeRoy (February 7, 1885 – September 7, 1946) was a tennis player from New York City in the United States, who won two medals at the 1904 Summer Olympics in St. Louis. He won a Silver medal in both the men's singles event and the men's doubles tournament, partnering Alphonzo Bell.

Tennis career
He played collegiate tennis at Columbia University, where in 1904 and 1906 he won the National Collegiate Athletics Association singles championship. In 1907, he was a singles finalist at the U.S. National Championships, now known as the US Open. In the semi finals against Henry Mollenhauer, LeRoy trailed 2 sets to 1 and 5–2 and Mollenhauer had two match points. A questionable line call and his opponent suffering from cramps allowed LeRoy to reach the final, where he lost in straight sets to eventual seven times champion William Larned. He also won three consecutive singles titles (1907–1909) at the tournament now known as the Cincinnati Masters.

References

1885 births
1946 deaths
American male tennis players
Columbia Lions men's tennis players
Olympic silver medalists for the United States in tennis
Tennis people from New York (state)
Tennis players at the 1904 Summer Olympics
Medalists at the 1904 Summer Olympics